Richard R. Wier Jr. (born May 19, 1941) is an American politician who served as the Attorney General of Delaware from 1975 to 1979.

References

1941 births
Living people
Delaware Attorneys General
Delaware Democrats
People from Wilmington, Delaware